Marwin Talsma  (born 19 December 1997) is a Dutch long track speed skater who specializes in the 5000 and 10000 meter.

He made his international championship debut at the 2021 European Speed Skating Championships in Heerenveen. He is a member of Team Zaanlander.

Records

Personal records

Talmsa occupies the 55th position on the adelskalender with a score of 149.389 points

References

External links
 

1997 births
Living people
Dutch male speed skaters
People from Sneek
Sportspeople from Friesland